Taking it to Hart is a 1996 studio album by Ian Shaw, focusing on the songs written by Richard Rodgers and Lorenz Hart.

Critical reception

Dave Burns of JazzTimes said that Shaw "is blessed with strong pipes and good intonation; unfortunately, he has also mastered every pop mannerism-bathos, exaggerated dynamics, melodramatic vibrato, fake-Southern diction, swoops of pointless-tasteless Mathis falsetto, the Tom Jones vocal wink, the ain't-we-hip scat", but added that the musicians and arrangements added a "tender counterpoint".

Track listing
"I Wish I Were in Love Again" – 2:58
"Where or When" – 3:24
"Have You Met Miss Jones?" – 4:11
"I Could Write a Book" – 4:00
"My Romance"/"Any Old Place with You" – 3:10
"Little Girl Blue" – 4:01
"I Didn't Know What Time It Was" – 6:07
"My Funny Valentine" – 5:12
"Blue Moon" – 1:55
"This Can't Be Love" – 3:00
"It Never Entered My Mind" – 5:12
"This Funny World" – 3:51
"With a Song in My Heart" – 5:47

All music composed by Richard Rodgers, with all lyrics written by Lorenz Hart.

Personnel
Ian Shaw - vocals, arranger
Carol Grimes - vocals
Mari Wilson - vocals
Iain Ballamy - tenor saxophone
Mornington Lockett - tenor saxophone
Guy Barker - trumpet
Tim Wells - double bass
Matthew Barley - cello
Mark Fletcher - drums
Adrian York - piano

References

1996 albums
Ian Shaw (singer) albums